Global travel consolidation is the convergence of the components of a managed travel program at a regional level, and is a process used by Corporate Travel Management companies. In practice, this means leveraging travel volumes and concentrating sourcing with one travel provider, as well as standardizing travel policies, processes and tools. When companies consolidate their travel programs, savings come from two principal sources:

 Standardized Travel Policy and Processes: Aligning travel policy rules across operational divisions and standardizing processes brings the greatest savings. In general, companies standardize three rules: travel policy entitlements, pre-trip approval and advance booking.
 Standardized booking and fulfillment: By optimizing productivity of the service configuration and booking processes companies make significant savings on transaction costs.

Global Travel Consolidation (Trade) Organizations
Association of Corporate Travel Executives
National Business Travel Association

Travel